The 2017 Toronto Argonauts season was the 60th season for the team in the Canadian Football League and their 145th season overall. The Argonauts finished the season in first place in the East Division and finished with a 9–9 record. 

The Argonauts improved upon their 5–13 record from 2016 with their sixth win after 13 games and clinched a playoff spot following a Hamilton Tiger-Cats loss on October 13, 2017. The team hosted their first playoff game since 2013, in which they defeated the crossover Saskatchewan Roughriders in the East Final by a score of 25–21. The Argonauts made their 23rd appearance in the Grey Cup championship game and won for the 17th time in the 105th Grey Cup game in Ottawa against the league-leading Calgary Stampeders by a score of 27–24. It was the third largest fourth-quarter comeback in Grey Cup history (eight-point deficit) and the Argos became the first team in Grey Cup history with two touchdowns of 100-plus yards. 

With the 2018 Toronto Argonauts team failing to qualify for the playoffs, the 2017 Argonauts became the first championship team since the 1970 Montreal Alouettes to miss the playoffs in both the preceding and following years.

Going back to the beginning of the year, it was announced on February 28, 2017 that Jim Popp would assume the duties of general manager and Marc Trestman would take on head coaching duties. The end result, as noted above, was a stark contrast to their 2016 season, with people calling for the dismissal for Jim Barker and Scott Milanovich toward the latter portions of the 2016 Toronto Argonauts season.

Offseason

CFL draft 
The 2017 CFL Draft took place on May 7, 2017. The Argonauts had six selections in the eight-round draft after trading the first overall pick for Drew Willy and their sixth-round pick for S. J. Green.

Preseason 
The Toronto Argonauts won their first preseason game with a dominant defensive performance, returning two Montreal interceptions for touchdowns in the game. In the second preseason game, this time on the road, the Argos came back to win against their hated rivals Hamilton – while notably not giving any game reps to Grey Cup-winning quarterbacks Ricky Ray or Drew Willy.

 Games played with colour uniforms.

Regular season

Standings

Schedule 

 Games played with colour uniforms.
 Games played with white uniforms.

Post-season

Schedule

 Games played with colour uniforms.

Team

Roster

Coaching staff

References

Toronto Argonauts seasons
2017 Canadian Football League season by team
2017 in Toronto
Grey Cup championship seasons